Kuyurgazinsky District (Köyörgäźe rayonı) is an administrative and municipal district (raion), one of the fifty-four in the Republic of Bashkortostan, Russia. It is located in the southwest of the republic and borders with Fyodorovsky and Meleuzovsky Districts in the north, Kugarchinsky District in the east, and with Orenburg Oblast in the east, south, and west. Its administrative center is the rural locality (a selo) of Yermolayevo. As of the 2010 Census, the total population of the district was 25,125, with the population of Yermolayevo accounting for 25.5% of that number.

History
The district was established on January 31, 1935. Until 1992, it was called Kumertausky District.

Administrative and municipal status
Within the framework of administrative divisions, Kuyurgazinsky District is one of the fifty-four in the Republic of Bashkortostan. The district is divided into twelve selsoviets, comprising eighty-four rural localities. As a municipal division, the district is incorporated as Kuyurgazinsky Municipal District. Its twelve selsoviets are incorporated as twelve rural settlements within the municipal district. The selo of Yermolayevo serves as the administrative center of both the administrative and municipal district.

References

Notes

Sources

Districts of Bashkortostan
States and territories established in 1935